War Eagles Air Museum is an aerospace and automotive museum with several exhibits. It is located at Doña Ana County International Jetport in Santa Teresa, New Mexico.

History 
The museum was established by West Texas engineer, rancher and oilman John T. MacGuire and his wife Betty MacGuire. As pilots, they began collecting warbirds after encountering them in Oshkosh, Wisconsin in 1979. As the collection grew, they looked for a place to build a museum to display their collection. After considering several options such as Las Cruces, New Mexico and Reno, Nevada, John decided to build the museum closer to their home near the Doña Ana County International Airport. The  facility unofficially opened to the public on 13 September 1989. Shortly after opening, the museum purchased a Tupolev Tu-2 from China.

The museum completed a  expansion in 1996.

Aircraft 

 Bell OH-58 Kiowa
 Boeing PT-13D
 Canadair CT-133 Silver Star
 Canadair Sabre 6
 Cessna 140
 Cessna T-37B Tweet
 Curtiss Kittyhawk IA
 de Havilland Tiger Moth
 Douglas RB-26C Invader
 Douglas C-47A Skytrain
 General Motors TBM-3E Avenger
 Hawker Sea Fury FB.10
 Hughes OH-6A Cayuse
 Lockheed F-5G Lightning
 LTV A-7E Corsair II
 Mikoyan-Gurevich MiG-21SPS
 Mil Mi-2
 Morane-Saulnier MS.502
 North American FJ-2 Fury
 North American P-51D Mustang
 North American AT-6F Texan
 North American T-28B Trojan
 Northrop AT-38B Talon
 Piper J-3 Cub
 Republic F-84F Thunderstreak
 Stinson L-5 Sentinel
 Stinson L-13A
 Stinson Reliant
 Tupolev Tu-2
 Vought F4U-4 Corsair
 Vultee BT-13B Valiant
 WSK-Mielec Lim-2
 WSK-Mielec Lim-2

Automobiles 

 Auburn Speedster
 BMW R5
 Buick Roadmaster
 Cadillac Biarritz
 Cadillac Eldorado
 Cadillac Series 61
 Cadillac Series 62
 Chevrolet 2-door
 Ford Model A
 Ford Model T
 Ford Mustang
 Ford Standard
 Honda N600
 Jaguar E-Type
 Lincoln Continental Mark IV
 MG TF
 Nash Rambler
 Oldsmobile Curved Dash
 Oldsmobile Custom Cruiser
 Overland Model 24
 Packard One-Twenty
 Packard Super Eight
 Porsche 912
 Rolls-Royce Silver Cloud
 Volvo Amazon

See also
List of aviation museums

References

Notes

Bibliography

External links

 

Museums in Doña Ana County, New Mexico